Sir Benjamin Collins Brodie, 1st Baronet,  (9 June 178321 October 1862) was an English physiologist and surgeon who pioneered research into bone and joint disease.

Biography
	
Brodie was born in Winterslow, Wiltshire.  He received his early education from his father, the Rev Peter Bellinger Brodie; then choosing medicine as his profession he went to London in 1801 and attended the lectures of John Abernethy and attended Charterhouse School.  Two years later he became a pupil of Sir Everard Home at St George's Hospital, and in 1808 was appointed assistant surgeon at that institution, on the staff of which he served for over thirty years. In 1810 he was elected a fellow of the Royal Society, to which in the next four or five years he contributed several papers describing original investigations in physiology. In 1834, he was elected a foreign member of the Royal Swedish Academy of Sciences.

At this period he also rapidly obtained a large and lucrative practice and from time to time wrote on surgical questions, contributing numerous papers to the Medical and Chirurgical Society and to the medical journals.  His most important work is widely acknowledged to be the 1818 treatise Pathological and Surgical Observations on the Diseases of the Joints, in which he attempts to trace the beginnings of disease in the different tissues that form a joint and to give an exact value to the symptom of pain as evidence of organic disease.  This volume led to the adoption by surgeons of more conservative measures in the treatment of diseases of the joints, with consequent reduction in the number of amputations and the saving of many limbs and lives. He also wrote on diseases of the urinary organs and on local nervous affections of a surgical character.

In 1854 he published anonymously a volume of Psychological Inquiries “... to illustrate ... the Mental Faculties” — by the third edition of 1856, it bore his name.  Eight years later, in 1862, a “Second Part” on “ ... the Physical and Moral History of Man” appeared.  He received many honours during his career and attended to the health of the Royal Family, starting with George IV.  He was also sergeant-surgeon to William IV and Queen Victoria and was made a baronet in 1834.  He became a corresponding member of the French Institute in 1844, Foreign Honorary Member of the American Academy of Arts and Sciences and DCL of Oxford in 1855, president of the Royal Society in 1858 and subsequently, the first president of the General Medical Council.

In 1858 Henry Gray dedicated his work Gray's Anatomy to Sir Benjamin Collins Brodie.

Sir Benjamin Collins Brodie died of a shoulder tumour in Broome Park, Surrey at the age of 79. His collected works, with autobiography, were published in 1865 under the editorship of Charles Hawkins. (Timothy Holmes wrote a 255-page biography Sir Benjamin Collins Brodie (1898).)

In 1816 Brodie had married Anne Sellon, daughter of an eminent lawyer and they had several children of whom three survived into maturity. His eldest son was the Oxford chemist Sir Benjamin Collins Brodie, 2nd Baronet.

See also
 List of presidents of the Royal Society

References

Bibliography

 

1783 births
1862 deaths
People from Wiltshire
British surgeons
English surgeons
Fellows of the American Academy of Arts and Sciences
Fellows of the Royal Society
Presidents of the Royal Society
Recipients of the Copley Medal
Members of the Royal Swedish Academy of Sciences
Baronets in the Baronetage of the United Kingdom
18th-century British medical doctors
19th-century British medical doctors
People educated at Charterhouse School
British physiologists
Chairs of the General Medical Council